Ronald Paul Bucca (May 6, 1954 – September 11, 2001) was a New York City Fire Department Marshal killed during the September 11 attacks during the collapse of the World Trade Center. He was the only fire marshal in the history of the New York City Fire Department to be killed in the line of duty.

Military career
Bucca had served in the United States Army as a Green Beret during the Vietnam War. Later, he would serve the Defense Intelligence Agency (DIA) as an analyst. Becoming a reservist in 1986, he joined the FDNY. He was subsequently injured on the job, which cost him his qualifications as a paratrooper and ended his eligibility with the Army Special Forces, causing him to leave the service.

Firefighting career

Bucca was a 22-year veteran of the department; he was promoted to Fire Marshal in 1992. As such, he was one of the people who investigated the 1993 World Trade Center bombing and the FDNY representative on the Joint Terrorism Task Force. By 2000, the fire department's seat was removed, and Bucca's position there relinquished.

After responding to the September 11, 2001 attacks, Bucca ascended to the impact zone at the Sky Lobby on the 78th floor of the South Tower of the World Trade Center, along with Battalion Chief Orio Palmer. The two men, both experienced marathon runners, are believed to have made it to the highest floor of any first responders in either tower before the building collapsed.

Legacy
In 2003, military police named the principal detainee holding camp in Iraq "Camp Bucca".

At the National 9/11 Memorial, Bucca is memorialized at the South Pool, on Panel S-14, along with those of other first responders killed in the attacks.

DIA honors Bucca each year through an annual award named after him. The award is given to a military reservist who demonstrates excellence in fulfilling the counterterrorism mission, the area that Bucca worked while at DIA.

References

External links

"Ronald Paul Bucca". Legacy.com.
 

1954 births
2001 deaths
United States Army soldiers
United States Army personnel of the Vietnam War
Members of the United States Army Special Forces
New York City firefighters
Emergency workers killed in the September 11 attacks
American terrorism victims
Terrorism deaths in New York (state)
People murdered in New York City
Male murder victims
Filmed killings
People from Tuckahoe, Westchester County, New York
Burials at Gate of Heaven Cemetery (Hawthorne, New York)